Sindre Guldvog (born 21 March 1955) is a Norwegian publisher.

He was born in Trondheim, and graduated as siv.øk. in 1977. From 1988 he was the CEO of the publishing house J.W. Cappelens Forlag. When Cappelen merged with Damm in 2007, Tom Harald Jenssen became the CEO of the new company Cappelen Damm. Guldvog was also chair of the Norwegian Publishers Association from 1996 to 1999.

References

1955 births
Living people
Norwegian book publishers (people)
People from Trondheim